Melothria sphaerocarpa is a species of flowering plant from the genus Melothria.

References

Cucurbitaceae
Taxa named by Alfred Cogniaux